The Canadian National Association of Infrared Imaging Technologists (AIIT) is a Canadian not-for-profit professional association concerned with maintaining high standards of service delivery, training, and continued education of infrared imaging thermographers. The association is a membership driven, self-regulating body for the industry.

AIIT awards and manages the IIT professional certification to qualified thermographers and technologists in Canada.

References

See also
 Thermographic camera
 Thermography
 Infrared photography

Infrared imaging